Madgi is a census town in Bhandara district  in the state of Maharashtra, India.

Demographics
 India census, Madgi had a population of 5759. Males constitute 50% of the population and females 50%. Madgi has an average literacy rate of 75%, higher than the national average of 59.5%: male literacy is 82% and, female literacy is 67%. In Madgi, 11% of the population is under 6 years of age.

References

Cities and towns in Bhandara district